Sir Terence Michael Heiser GCB (born 1932) is a former British senior civil servant.

Heiser served as Permanent Secretary at the Department of the Environment from 1985 to 1992.

Heiser was appointed Companion of the Order of the Bath (CB) in the 1984 New Year Honours. He was promoted to Knight Commander (KCB) in the 1987 Birthday Honours and to Knight Grand Cross (GCB) in the 1992 New Year Honours.

References

1932 births
Living people
Permanent Under-Secretaries of State for the Environment
Knights Grand Cross of the Order of the Bath